William Samuel McCormack (November 10, 1863 – September 5, 1946) was an American politician in the state of Montana who served as Lieutenant Governor of Montana from 1925 to 1929. McCormack, who lived in Kalispell, Montana, was a farmer and businessman. He also served in the Montana House of Representatives.

References

1863 births
1946 deaths
Montana Republicans
Lieutenant Governors of Montana